Jeni Thornley (born 1948) is an Australian feminist documentary filmmaker, writer, film valuer and research associate at University of Technology, Sydney. Since leaving her job as Manager of the Women's Film Fund at the Australian Film Commission in 1986, Thornley has worked as an independent writer, director and producer at Anandi Films. She has fulfilled teaching roles at UTS and the Australian School for Film and Television. Thornley is currently an Honorary Research Associate in the Faculty of Arts and Social Sciences at UTS. She is also a consultant film valuer for the Cultural Gifts Program, Dept of Communications and the Arts.

Career

According to Collins (1998), Thornley "belongs to a 1960s generation of New Left filmmakers whose revived historical consciousness was germinated during the Cold War years in the silent fallout from Hiroshima". Born in Tasmania where her father was a film exhibitor, Thornley gained a degree in literature and political science at Monash University in Melbourne in 1969. After moving to Sydney she worked as an actor in experimental theatre and was active in the Women’s Liberation Movement, Sydney Women's Film Group (SWFG), the Sydney Filmmakers Co-operative and the Feminist Film Workers Collective. As a member of SWFG, Thornley appeared in and worked on the production of the 1973 film, A Film for Discussion.

Thornley was one of the organisers of the International Women’s Year Film Festival in 1975, the first of its kind in Australia. As an active member of feminist collectives until the early 1980s, she was involved in a range of exhibition, distribution and publishing activities as well as working as a camera assistant on independent film productions.

In 1978 Thornley released her first film, the 27½ minute Maidens. The first two parts look at the lives of Thornley's mother, grandmother and great-grandmother through archival photographs and interviews. The second two parts show her own life in film, combining family photographs with feminist material of the 1970s. The film received funding from the Australian Film Commission. "It remains essential viewing for an enhanced understanding of the moment of awakened consciousness that characterised 1970s feminism." The film also acts as a short history of "the Anglo-Celtic 'diaspora' in Australia."

In 1983 Thornley coproduced with Megan McMurchy, Margot Oliver and Margot Nash the film, For Love or Money. The film had its roots back in 1977, when Thornley and the others decided to start working on the documentary. In addition, Thornley coordinated the collection of all the photographic material used for the companion book, jointly written with Megan McMurchy and Margot Oliver, For Love or Money, a Pictorial History of Women and Work in Australia, published by Penguin Books Australia in 1983 .

Island Home Country – documentary and exegesis – (2009) was the culmination of Thornley's research for which she received a PhD from University of Technology, Sydney. The documentary screened nationally on ABC1 and ABC2 in June and July 2009.

Collins (1998) has stated that "Thornley’s personal films (Maidens and To the Other Shore) and her social action films (A Film for Discussion and For Love or Money) are landmark films in the history of Australian feminist cinema over the last three decades". To the Other Shore explores death and motherhood through the narration of the fairy tale, Hansel and Gretel.

Filmography

Publications

 For Love or Money : A pictorial history of women and work in Australia, co-written with Megan McMurchy and Margot Oliver, Penguin, 1983,

Chapters contributed
 "Past, Present and Future: The Women's Film Fund", in Don't Shoot Darling!: Women's Independent Filmmaking in Australia, edited by Annette Blonski, Barbara Creed, Freda Freiberg, Greenhouse Publications, 1987, 
 "Through A Glass Darkly: Meditations on Cinema, Psychoanalysis and Feminism", in Womenvision : Women and the moving image in Australia, edited by Lisa French, Damned Publishing, 2003, 
 "Island Home Country: Working with Aboriginal protocols in a documentary film about colonisation and growing up white in Tasmania," chapter 13. in Passionate Histories: Myth, Memory and Indigenous Australia, edited by Frances Peters-Little, Ann Curthoys and John Docker, ANU E Press, 2010,

References

External links

1948 births
Living people
Australian documentary filmmakers
Australian film directors
Australian women film directors
Monash University alumni
University of Technology Sydney alumni
Women documentary filmmakers